María de la Encarnación Paso Ramos  (25 March 1931 – 18 August 2019), better known as Encarna Paso, was a Spanish film and television actress.

Biography 
Daughter of playwright Antonio Paso Díaz, granddaughter of Antonio Paso y Cano and niece granddaughter of Manuel Paso Cano, niece of Enrique Paso, Manuel Paso and Alfonso Paso, also playwrights, and actresses Mercedes Paso, Maruja Paso, Elisa Paso and Soledad Paso. Mother of actor Juan Calot (together with the late actress Yolanda Ríos) and Patricia Calot, dedicated to cultural management. Grandmother of the actors Alicia Calot and Edgar Calot.

She died on 18 August 2019 in Madrid at the age of 88 from pneumonia.

Selected filmography
 The Curious Impertinent (1953)
 Queen of The Chantecler (1962)
 The Mustard Grain (1962)
 The Glass Ceiling (1971)
 Retrato de Familia (1976)
 Begin the Beguine (1982), first Spanish film to win an Academy Award.
 La colmena (1982)
 Sesión continua (1984)

References

Bibliography
 Ronald Schwartz. Great Spanish Films Since 1950. Scarecrow Press, 2008.

External links

1931 births
2019 deaths
Spanish film actresses
Spanish stage actresses
Spanish television actresses
Actresses from Madrid
Deaths from pneumonia in Spain
20th-century Spanish actresses